The Bangladesh cricket team toured the West Indies and the United States between June and August 2018 to play two Tests, three One Day Internationals (ODIs) and three Twenty20 International (T20I) matches. The final two T20I matches took place at the Central Broward Regional Park, in Lauderhill, Florida. The second Test took place in Jamaica, fourteen years after Bangladesh last played a Test there. Bangladesh last toured the West Indies in September 2014.

The tour was originally planned to take place in March 2018, but in August 2017 it was announced that the fixtures would be moved, most likely to July 2018, to accommodate the 2018 Cricket World Cup Qualifier. In May 2018, the Bangladesh Cricket Board (BCB) announced thirty-one member preliminary squad ahead of the tour.

The West Indies won the Test series 2–0. 
Bangladesh won the ODI series 2–1, their second ODI series win in the West Indies. Bangladesh won the T20I series 2–1. After the series, Bangladesh's coach Steve Rhodes said that he was proud of the team after coming back strong after the defeats in the Test series, and was surprised to win the T20I series.

Squads

Bangladesh also named Yeasin Arafat, Abu Hider, Nayeem Hasan, Mosaddek Hossain and Mustafizur Rahman as standby players ahead of the Test series. Before the second Test, Alzarri Joseph was added to the West Indies' squad, replacing Kemar Roach, who suffered an injury during the first Test. Sheldon Cottrell replaced the injured Andre Russell in the West Indies' squad for third ODI.

Tour matches

Two-day match: West Indies President's XI vs Bangladesh

50 over match: UWI Vice Chancellor's XI vs Bangladesh

Test series

1st Test

2nd Test

ODI Series

1st ODI

2nd ODI

3rd ODI

T20I series

1st T20I

2nd T20I

3rd T20I

Notes

References

External links
 Series home at ESPN Cricinfo

2018 in West Indian cricket
2018 in Bangladeshi cricket
International cricket competitions in 2018
Bangladeshi cricket tours of the West Indies